{{DISPLAYTITLE:C8H10N2O3S}}
The molecular formula C8H10N2O3S (molar mass: 214.242 g/mol) may refer to:

 Diazald, or N-methyl-N-nitroso-p-toluenesulfonamide
 Sulfacetamide

Molecular formulas